This is a list of alumni, former staff, and those otherwise associated with Sciences Po. For further information, refer to the list of Sciences Po alumni in the French Wikipedia. Neither list is complete.

Heads of international organisations
 Boutros Boutros-Ghali (1922–2016), United Nations Secretary-General (1992–1996)
 Michel Camdessus (b. 1933), Managing Director of the International Monetary Fund (1987–2000)
 Nicole Fontaine (1942–2018), President of the European Parliament (1999–2001)
 Pascal Lamy (b. 1947), Director-General of the World Trade Organization
 Bertrand Badré (b. 1968) Managing Director of World Bank (2013–Present)
 Pierre Lellouche, president of the NATO Parliamentary Assembly
 Roger Ockrent (1907–1983), chairman of the Organisation for Economic Co-operation and Development (1957–1974)
 Dominique Strauss-Kahn (b. 1949), ex-Managing Director of the International Monetary Fund 
 Simone Veil (1927–2017), president of the European Parliament (1979–1984)
 Alpha Condé (b. 1938), Chairperson of African Union (2017–present)
 Gilbert Guillaume (b. 1930), ex president of the International Court of Justice(2000-2003)
 Audrey Azoulay (b. 1972), Director general to UNESCO (2017–present)
 Wan Waithayakon (1891–1976), president of the United Nations General Assembly (1956–1958)
 Justin Vaïsse (b. 1973), Director General of the Paris Peace Forum
 Marisol Touraine (b. 1959), Chair of Unitaid Executive Board

Heads of state or government

World
 Pridi Banomyong (1900-1983), Prime Minister of Thailand (1946), Regent of Thailand (1941–45)
 Edvard Beneš (1884–1948), President of Czechoslovakia (1935–1948)
 Paul Biya (b. 1933), President of Cameroon (1982–present)
 Hissène Habré (b. 1942), President of Chad (1982–1990)
 Habib Bourguiba (1903–2000), President of Tunisia (1957–1987)
 Alpha Condé (b. 1938), President of Guinea (2010–present)
 Esko Aho,(b. 1954), former prime minister to Finland (1991-1995)
 Bảo Đại (1913–1997), Emperor of Vietnam (1926–1955), Emperor of Annam (1926–1945)
 Chandrika Kumaratunga (b. 1945), President of Sri Lanka (1994–2005)
 Mohammad Mosaddegh (1882–1967), Prime Minister of Iran (1951–1953), Time magazine Man of the Year (1951)
 Rainier III (1923–2005), Prince of Monaco (1949–2005)
 Enrico Letta, Prime Minister of Italy (2013-2014), Present Dean at Sciences Po
 José Sócrates (b. 1957), Prime Minister of Portugal (2005–2011)
 Pierre Trudeau (1919–2000), Prime Minister of Canada (1968–1979, 1980–1984)
 Pierre Werner (1913–2002), Prime Minister of Luxembourg (1959–1974, 1979–1984), so-called "father of the Euro"
 Hasan Saka (1885–1960), Prime Minister of Turkey (1947-1949)
Salome Zurabishvili (12-2018), President of Georgia

France
 Édouard Balladur (b. 1929), Prime Minister of France (1993–1995)
 Raymond Barre (1924–2007), Prime Minister of France (1976–1981)
 Jacques Chaban-Delmas (1915–2000), Prime Minister of France (1969–1972)
 Jacques Chirac (1932-2019), President of the French Republic (1995–2007), Prime Minister of France (1983–1986, 1986–1988) 
 Maurice Couve de Murville (1907–1999), Prime Minister of France (1968–1969)
 Michel Debré (1912–1996), Prime Minister of France (1959–1962)
 Laurent Fabius (b. 1946), Prime Minister of France (1983–1986)
 François Hollande (b. 1954), President of the French Republic (2012–2017)
 Lionel Jospin (b. 1937), Prime Minister of France (1997–2002)
 Alain Juppé (b. 1945), Prime Minister of France (1995–1997)
 Emmanuel Macron (b. 1977), President of the French Republic (2017)
 Pierre Mauroy (1928–2013) Prime Minister of France (1981–1984)
 François Mitterrand (1916–1996), President of the French Republic (1981–1995)
 Michel Rocard (1930–2016), Prime Minister of France (1988–1991)
 Dominique de Villepin (b. 1953), Prime Minister of France (2005–2007)

Politics and government

World

 Nebahat Albayrak, Turkish–Dutch politician in the Netherlands;
 Alin Mituța, Member of the European Parliament, former Secretary of State in the Romanian Government
 Brady Anderson, US ambassador to the United Republic of Tanzania
 François-Albert Angers, Canadian economist
 Jihad Azour, Minister of Finance of Lebanon (2005–present)
 Jeremy Kinsman, former Canadian ambassador to European Union
 Howard Balloch, erstwhile Canadian ambassador to China, director at Zi Corporation
 Rula Ghani, First lady of Afghanistan
 Adrian A. Basora, United States ambassador
 Cina Lawson, Minister in Togo Government
 Íngrid Betancourt, Colombian senator, anti-corruption activist, and candidate for president of Colombia
 Sir John Henry Birchenough, GCMG (1853 –1937), English public servant; President of the British South Africa Company (1925-1937)
 L. Paul Bremer (b. 1941), U.S. Civil Administrator in Iraq (2003–2004)
 Caroline, Princess of Hanover, princess of the Principality of Monaco; daughter of American actress Grace Kelly
 Sir Austen Chamberlain, British Foreign Secretary (1924–1929); 1925 winner of the Nobel Peace Prize
 Yves-Thibault de Silguy, EU Commissioner for Economic and Financial Affairs
 Božidar Đelić, vice-president of the government of Serbia, 2007-
 Alain Destexhe, Belgian liberal senator and author
 Stéphane Dion, former leader of the Liberal Party of Canada and former Canadian Minister of Foreign Affairs.
 Roland Dumas (b. 1922), French Minister of Foreign Affairs (1984–1993)
 William Eagleton, representative of UN Secretary-General for Western Sahara; erstwhile US ambassador to Syria
 Joaquim do Espirito Santo, ambassador of Angola to the United States
 James Foley, US ambassador to Haiti (2003–2005)
 Ahmad Kamal, Pakistani ambassador to the United Nations
 Bernard Landry, former Premier of Quebec
 Ertuğrul Osman, pretender to the title of Sultan of the Ottoman Empire; head of the house of Osmanli (1994–2009)
 Sam Rainsy, Cambodian opposition leader; Member of Parliament
 Leon Reich, member of the Sejm of Poland
 Charles Rizk, Lebanese justice minister 2005-
 Nano Ružin, Macedonian professor of political and social sciences, Ex-Macedonian Ambassador to NATO, and presidential candidate of the Liberal Democratic Party in 2009
 Afif Safieh, Palestinian ambassador to the US, regarded as the most articulate living Palestinian diplomat
 Nawaf Salam, ambassador and permanent representative of Lebanon to the United Nations
 Ghassan Salamé, former Minister of Culture of Lebanon (2000–2003); prolific author on Middle East politics
 Ieng Sary, deputy Prime Minister and Foreign Minister of Democratic Kampuchea, 1975-1979
 Brad Setser, former Deputy Secretary in the US Treasury Department
 Mike Schmuhl, manager for the Pete Buttigieg 2020 presidential campaign
 Sally Shelton-Colby, assistant administrator of the Bureau for Global Programs, Field Support, and Research in the US Department of State, erstwhile US ambassador to Grenada and Barbados
 Joan E. Spero, Under Secretary of State for Economic, Business, and Agricultural Affairs
 Jonas Gahr Støre, Norwegian Minister of Health and Care Services; former Minister of Foreign Affairs (2005–2012)
 Francis Orlando Wilcox (1908–1985), Assistant Secretary of State of the USA (1955–1961)
 Stanley Woodward, erstwhile US ambassador to Canada
 Salome Zurabishvili, former French diplomat, former Minister of Foreign Affairs of Georgia and the current leader of the United Georgian Opposition
 Thanat Khoman, Thai Minister of Foreign Affairs 1959-1971 and Deputy Prime Minister 1981-1983
 Joseph Ki-Zerbo, Burkinabé advocate for African independence
 Władysław Grabski, Prime Minister of Poland 1920, 1923-1925

France

 Ministers (N.B. This is a small selection given the large number of Fifth Republic ministers who studied at the institute.)
 Martine Aubry, former French Minister for Social Affairs, mayor of Lille (in French: Martine Aubry)
 Dominique Baudis, French MP and former mayor of Toulouse (in French: Dominique Baudis)
 Jean-Louis Bourlanges, member of the European Parliament; vice-président of the UDF
 Jean-Pierre Chevènement, former French Minister of Interior
 Bernadette Chirac, former First Lady of France; Representative in Corrèze General Council; chairwoman of Fondation Hôpitaux de Paris; wife of former French president Jacques Chirac
 Renaud Denoix de Saint Marc, vice-president of the Council of State
 Olivier Duhamel, former member of the European Parliament; former Member of the European Convention (in French: Olivier Duhamel)
 Hervé Gaymard, former French Minister of Finance
 Jean-Marcel Jeanneney, former Minister of Industry, French ambassador to Algeria
 Jack Lang, former French Minister of Culture and Education
 Emmanuel Macron, Minister of the Economy, Industry and Digital Affairs and now President of France
 Xavier Musca, director of the French Treasury; Director-General of the French Treasury and Economic Development Department (2002–present)
 Jean Peyrelevade, civil servant, politician and business leader
 Ségolène Royal, a defeated 2007 presidential candidate
 Hubert Védrine, former French Minister of Foreign Affairs (1997–2002)
 Maurice Papon, French civil servant, Gaullist politician and Nazi collaborator
 Diplomats (N.B. This is a small selection given that almost every diplomat since the inception of the Fifth Republic studied at the institute.)
 Hervé Alphand, erstwhile French ambassador to the United States, UN, NATO, and the OEEC
 Roland de Margerie, former ambassador of France to Germany
 Gérard Errera, ambassador of France to the United Kingdom (2002–present)
 André François-Poncet, former ambassador of France to Germany
 Dominique Girard, ambassador of France to India
 Daniel Jouanneau, ambassador of France to Canada (2004–present)
 Jean-David Levitte (b. 1946), ambassador of France to the USA (2002–present); Permanent Representative of France to the United Nations (2000–2002)
 Claude Martin, ambassador of France to Germany (2001–present)
 Jean-Maurice Ripert, former Permanent Representative of France to the United Nations, Ambassador of France to Russia, and Ambassador of France to China
 Advisors:
 Ismaël Emelien (born c. 1987), Advisor to Emmanuel Macron
 Jean Messiha (born 1970), Advisor to the National Front
Members of the European Parliament:
Raphaël Glucksmann - Chair, Special Committee on Foreign Interference in all Democratic Processes in the European Union

Anan Bouapha - Founder/President of Proud To Be Us Laos - National Movement of LGBTI Rights in the Lao PDR

Academia, journalism and literature
 Luis López Álvarez, Spanish poet, writer, and professor
 Raymond Aron
 Olivier Auroy, novelist
 Jean-Pierre Azéma 
 Frédéric Beigbeder, novelist
 Derek Bok, president of Harvard University
 Fernand Braudel
 Emmanuel Carrère
 Hélène Carrère d'Encausse, specialist of Russia, member of the Académie Française
 Louis Chauvel 
 Vincent Chauvet
 Houchang E. Chehabi, professor
 Paul Claudel, writer
 Jean-Marie Colombani, head of Le Monde
 Michèle Cotta 
 Michel Crozier
 Guillaume Dustan 
 Pierre Drieu La Rochelle
 Alain Duhamel, senior journalist at Le Monde and Libération
 Jean-Paul Fitoussi , French economist
 Matthew Fraser, editor-in-chief of National Post (Canada)
Jacques Frémontier (born surname Friedman; 1930–2020), French journalist and television producer
 Erhard Friedberg
 Jacques Généreux 
 Pierre Georges
 Hala Gorani, CNN journalist and anchorwoman
 Julien Gracq, novelist
 Nicolas Grenier, poet
 Stanley Hoffmann, professor at Harvard University
 Adrienne Jablanczy
 Christophe Jaffrelot 
 Rebecca Jarvis, finalist on The Apprentice, Season Four; reporter on CNBC
 Stanley Karnow, Pulitzer Prize-winning author on Southeast Asia; Fellow at the Council on Foreign Relations 
 Gilles Kepel
 Grayson Kirk, political scientist; president of Columbia University (1953–1968)
 Marc Lambron, novelist
 Bruno Latour
 Marc Lazar
Yvette Lebas-Guyot, journalist and World War II commander 
 Bernard-Henri Lévy, bestselling French writer; philosopher; political campaigner
 Paul Morand
 Anne Muxel
 Christine Ockrent, broadcast journalist
 Érik Orsenna, member of the Académie Française; former chief economic advisor to François Mitterrand
 Roger Peyrefitte, novelist
 Marcel Proust, novelist
 Edmond Marc du Rogoff, (a.k.a. Edmundo Marcos Rogoff) ancien professeur agregé, Université d'Ottawa
 David Pujadas
 René Rémond, historian, member of the Académie Française
 Jean-Christophe Rufin, novelist
 Russ Rymer, editor-in-chief of Mother Jones magazine
 Robert B. Silvers, co-editor of The New York Review of Books
 Anne Sinclair
 Jared Taylor
 Milana Terloeva, Chechen journalist and bestselling author
 Maurice Vaïsse
 Georges Vedel
 Florian Zeller, novelist, Prix Interallié 2004
 Hayeon Lim, South Korean socialite and author
 Élie Halévy, French philosopher and historian
 Pierre Hassner, Romanian-French geopolitologist and philosopher, Director Emeritus of Research at the Sciences Po Center for International Studies and Research
 Ma Jianzhong, author of the first Chinese grammar textbook written by a Chinese
 Pierre Milza, French historian, specialist in history of Italy and fascism
 Jean-Luc Parodi, French political scientist
 Pierre Renouvin, French historian of international relations
 Ian Goldin, British economist, former Distinguished Visiting Professor at Sciences Po, Founding Director of the Oxford Martin School

Business and finance
 Wilfried Baumgartner, governor of the Bank of France
 Jean-Hugues Bittner, CFO of Morgan Stanley Europe
 Michel Bon, former CEO of France Telecom and current CEO of Carrefour
 Daniel Bouton, former CEO of Société Générale
 Gerardo Braggiotti, CEO of Lazard LLC, Italy
 Nicolas Calemard, Director of Human Resources, LVMH
 Philippe Camus, CEO of European Aeronautic Defense and Space Company
 Richard Descoings, CEO and director of Sciences Po
 Romain Durand, CEO of Scor VIE
 Henri Giscard d'Estaing, CEO of Club Med
 Jean-Marc Espalioux, CEO of Accor, European leader and one of the world's largest hotel groups
 Elizabeth Fleuriot, CEO of Kellogg's France
 Michel Gardel, CEO of Toyota France
 Pierre-Yves Gerbeau, CEO of X-Leisure
 Frédéric Jolly, chairman of Russell for Europe, the Middle East, and Africa
 Jean-Pierre Jouyet, Director-General of the French Treasury and Economic Development Department
 Jacques de Larosière, former president of the European Bank for Reconstruction and Development
 Frédéric Lemoine, former CEO of Capgemini
 Gérard Mestrallet, CEO of Suez
 Léone-Noëlle Meyer, chairman of Galeries Lafayette from 1998 to 2005
 Thierry Moulonguet, CFO and Executive VP of Renault
 Frédéric Oudéa, CEO of Société Générale
 Laurence Parisot, “boss of the bosses”, former president of the MEDEF (ex-CNPF), director of the IFOP, CEO of Optimum
 Guillaume Pepy, President of SNCF, the French national railway company
 David René de Rothschild, chairman of N M Rothschild & Sons
 François Roussely, CEO of Credit Suisse France; vice-chairman of Credit Suisse Europe
 Javier Santiso, economist at the OECD, former Chief Economist for Latin America at BBVA
 Marie-Laure Sauty de Chalon, marketing executive and CEO of the aufeminin.com group
 Louis Schweitzer, former CEO of Renault
 Ernest-Antoine Seillière, “boss of the bosses”, president of the MEDEF (ex-CNPF)
 Jean-Cyril Spinetta, CEO of Air France
 Anne-Claire Tattinger, CEO of Société du Louvre, major luxury hotel and luxury goods company
 Agnès Touraine, CEO of Act III Consultants; former CEO of Vivendi Universal Publishing
 Jean-Claude Trichet, president of the European Central Bank (2003–2011), former governor of the Bank of France (1993–2003)
 Alex Vieux, CEO and founder of technology conference sponsor DASAR; publisher of Red Herring magazine
 Marc Vincent, director of Credit Suisse, former Managing Director at Citigroup France
 Serge Weinberg, CEO of Pinault Printemps Redoute, one of the world's largest luxury goods groups

Culture and sports

 Fanny Ardant, internationally acclaimed French movie star
 Camille, born Camille Dalmais, singer and songwriter
 Pierre Christin, French comics creator and writer (Valérian and Laureline)
 Pierre de Coubertin, founder of the modern Olympic Games
 Christian Dior, haute couture and fashion designer
 Marc Drillech, sociologist and President of universities
 Jingjing Fan, fashion designer and founder of Elleme
 Léo Ferré, singer and songwriter
 Thierry Gilardi, football and rugby commentator
 Anna Hopkins, actress
 Kimon Evan Marengo, British cartoonist
 Rafaela Reyes-Chaboussou, Academy Award-winning actress
 Teddy Riner, World Championships winner judoka,
 Anne Roumanoff, comedian
 Manvi Khosla, singer

References 

People associated with Sciences Po
Sciences Po